Cabin Flounder is the debut studio album by alternative rock band Fetchin Bones. It was released in 1985 through DB Records.

Track listing 
All songs written by Fetchin Bones

Personnel 

Fetchin Bones
 Marc Mueller – drums, bongo
 Hope Nicholls – vocals, harmonica
 Danna Pentes – bass guitar, violin
 Aaron Pitkin – guitar
 Gina Stewart – bass guitar, guitar, vocals
 Gary White – guitar, vocals, photography

Additional musicians and production
 Danny Beard – executive production
 Don Dixon – production, engineering, bass guitar
 Fetchin Bones – design
 James Flournoy Holmes – design
 LuAnn McEachern – photography
 Liz Winkler – photography

External links

References 

1985 debut albums
Albums produced by Don Dixon (musician)
DB Records albums
Fetchin Bones albums